M.A.S. Records is a British independent record label and music development program, founded in 2001 by Kevyn Gammond with musicians Robert Plant and Karl Hyde as its patrons.

History
The label was founded in 2001 by Kevyn Gammond who was a founder member of the Band of Joy alongside Robert Plant and Jimmy Page who went on to form Led Zeppelin. Gammond worked with Jimmy Cliff and  Jess Roden (among others) which led him to tour with The Rolling Stones, Jimi Hendrix and The Who. His knowledge of the music industry then led him to write and develop a pioneering music development course, a move that led to the creation of M.A.S. Records. 
In 2004, M.A.S. Records teamed up with BBC Hereford & Worcester and the Clifford T Ward foundation to launch the Clifford T Ward songwriting competition, which became a success, gaining the label international recognition when Arts And Entertainment US filmed a documentary following the label's success, and Robert Plant's involvement as patron - the documentary has since been broadcast worldwide.

In 2006, M.A.S. Records was presented with the European Social Fund Award for Learning Achievements, and then in 2008 they won the Rockschool sponsored National Music Award from Access To Music,  in recognition of the label's outstanding achievement, standards, and quality of provision. 
In 2010 M.A.S continued their involvement with Access To Music and Rockschool when they showcased their up-and-coming bands at South by Southwest in Austin, Texas, which is one of the largest festivals in the US.

M.A.S. Records receives funding from the European Social Fund, the Learning and Skills Council, Advantage West Midlands and Rockschool, Ltd.

List of M.A.S. Records artists

A
 A Certain Silence
 Adore
 Advent Children
 Atlanta House
 alternative milks

B
 Bad Sugar
 Balm
 Beyond the Bay
 Bite the Kerb
 Blind Rhythm
 Blue Season
 Buried Secrets

C
 Cafe De Kashmir
 The Cakes
 Casual Agenda 
 Caught In The Moment
 Chevron
 Clobber
 Call Me When You're Famous

D
 Daiquiri Cannons
 Damsons in Distress
 Dance A La Plage
 Danger Of Drowning
 Delirium Theory
 Done By Sunrise
 Dreamers Nightmares

E
 Effigy For Sleep
 Embers
 Emergency Room
 Empire
 Empty Friend
 Exide
 Exodus Calling
Endgame

F
 Feird Wish
 Fizzler
 Flipside Skin
 Forever Dilemma

G
 Gateway Club
 Gambling with Medusa
Goodbye Graceful
 Giant and the Georges
 Godeth

H
 Holocene
 Peanut and the Dudes
 Head To Head

I
 Influx
 Indifferent
Impartial Addiction
 Intrepid

J
 Jester
 Jazz Thrash Assassin

K
 Kairos 
 Keep The Change
 Killtimers
 Kill Joy City
 Karkosa

L
 Last Masquerade
 Lost in Olympus
 Lovats

M
 Man Half Machine
 More Than You Bargained For
 Morning Glory
 Mordrake
 Myriad

N
 Not By Decision
 Native Sons
 News at Ten

O
 Only Route Out
 Open Arms
 Override

P
 Page 44
 The Press
 Pretentious Class
 Pretty Selective
 Pixel Fix

R
 The Regulars
 Relocate My Satellites
 Ronin
 Rising Struggle

S
 Seeley's Jazz'Ole
 ShinKicker
 Shoot The Runner
 Spilt Milk Society
 Stormridden
 Switchplay
 Synthetic Recipe

T
 Tree
 The Assist
 The Breakout Scene
 The Common
 The Culture
 The Daniels
 The Grade
 The Indigo Project
 The Limelight
 The Nortons
 The SJS Band
 Teddy Punch
 That Cavalier Attitude  
 Their Souls for Gold
 This Memory
 Three Piece Lawsuit
 Tooth & Dagger   
 Treason Kings
 Trying The Tides
 The Outlyers
 The Press
 The Warped
 Trivax

V
 Vague Process

W
 We Are Saviours
 Wychbury Cartel
 Winstons Big Brother

X
 Xadium

See also 
 List of record labels

References

British independent record labels
Heavy metal record labels